"Colonel" Ed Fletcher (December 31, 1872 – October 15, 1955) was a real estate developer and U.S. Republican and Democratic politician from San Diego, California.

Fletcher was born 1872 in Littleton, Massachusetts, son of Charles Kimball Fletcher.
His family moved to Worcester and Boston, where he attended school.

In 1888 Fletcher, age 15, came to San Diego alone, and with $6.10 in his pocket began selling produce.
He was a born salesman and soon had his own business with a partner. In 1901, he entered the real estate business as a land agent, and started a partnership in 1908 with William J. Gross, silent film actor and producer. That partnership developed Grossmont, Mt. Helix, and Del Mar. Fletcher donated land on Mt. Helix where Easter Sunrise services are held.

In 1907, Fletcher was appointed Lieutenant Colonel of the California National Guard, which earned him the title "Colonel", which stuck for the remainder of his life.

Fletcher became interested in road building and saw to it many road projects were completed.  With Fred Jackson, Fletcher raised civic interest to building a road to Imperial Valley, thence a plank road across the desert to Yuma, Arizona.
Fletcher was later active in having state and U.S. highways built to San Diego.

Fletcher also took an interest in developing projects delivering water to San Diego, including creating Lake Hodges. Fletcher and Montana businessman James A. Murray purchased the San Diego Flume Company on June 1, 1910, renaming it the Cuyamaca Water Company. Fletcher and Murray owned and operated the company for 15 years, making or planning improvements to the water system of San Diego County including the construction of the San Vicente Dam and Reservoir, among others.

Fletcher was a director of the Panama-California Exposition (1915) and California Pacific International Exposition (1935). After the 1915 Expo, he raised funds to save the well-received temporary buildings from destruction. He also raised funds to buy land for the Naval Training Station in San Diego, and for building the YMCA.

In 1934 Fletcher was elected to the California State Senate, and served until 1947. Sometime while in the Senate, he switched his party affiliation from Republican to Democratic. He authored laws creating the San Diego County Water Authority and transferring ownership of Mission Bay to the city. While in the Senate he was able to acquire for San Diego a heroic statue of Juan Rodriguez Cabrillo, donated to the state in 1939 by the government of Portugal and claimed by both San Diego and Oakland. Fletcher personally "kidnapped" the statue from its storage in a garage at a private residence in Oakland; the statue is now on display at Cabrillo National Monument.

Fletcher married Mary C. Batchelder April 8, 1896 at Ayer, Massachusetts.
They had ten children: Catherine, Edward Jr.,
Congressman Charles K. Fletcher,
Lawrence, Willis, Stephen, Ferdinand, Mary Louise, Eugene, and Virginia.

Fletcher died in 1955 in San Diego.

Recognition
Ed Fletcher's legacy includes a number of landmarks in the San Diego area. These include:
Fletcher Parkway in La Mesa, 
Fletcher Hills in El Cajon
Fletcher Chimes of Hardy Memorial Tower at San Diego State University 
Fletcher Cove in Solana Beach
Fletcher Point on the southern shore of Lake Hodges

Colonel Fletcher Building 

The Fletcher Building, located at Sixth and Broadway in San Diego, housed the Barnett-Stine department store and later the Owl Drug Company, was built by Fletcher in 1906 along with Frank Salmans, and designed by Edward Quayle.   it was being remodeled by Champion Development Group.

References

,  vol. 1, pp. 346–350: "Roads, by Ed Fletcher"; and vol. 2,  pp. 128–132: "Ed Fletcher", includes portrait.
  Biography. Also has biography of his wife.
, pp. 27–47: "A Colony for Artists: 1902-1917"; photos.

Notes

External links
 Biography (San Diego Historical Society). Based on Heilbron's biography (above)
Ed Fletcher Papers MSS 81. Special Collections & Archives, UC San Diego Library.
 Join California Edward Fletcher

California state senators
Politicians from San Diego
1872 births
1955 deaths
Businesspeople from San Diego
California Republicans
California Democrats
People from Littleton, Massachusetts
20th-century American politicians